Broomhouse may refer to:

Broomhouse, Edinburgh, a housing estate in the western part of Scotland's capital city
Broomhouse, Glasgow, a residential suburb in the south-eastern part of Scotland's largest city
Broomhouse (alternatively Broom House), a former country estate near Duns, Scottish Borders
Broomhouse Farm, near Haggerston, Northumberland